American actress/singer Jeanette MacDonald (1903 – 1965) recorded over 50 songs during her film career for RCA Victor and its foreign counterparts. Due to the limited statistics released to the public, it is not certain how many songs and singles she has released or their exact popularity in music charts, although she has officially recorded eight studio albums (five LPs) and released seven compilation albums. Despite soundtracks for musical films not becoming a concept until the 1940s, many of her singles were re-recordings of songs she had performed in the movies (a common practice other musical actors did at the time); her first "album" was the single "Dream Lover"/"March of the Grenadiers" (1930) on 78 rpm discs for The Love Parade. She also recorded a cover album of songs featured in Sigmund Romberg's Up in Central Park in 1945 with Robert Merrill, as well as non-English records during her 1931 European tour.

MacDonald performed in musicals alongside Maurice Chevalier, Allan Jones, and Nelson Eddy, although her films with Eddy are the most well-known today. The single "Ah! Sweet Mystery of Life"/"Indian Love Call" from Rose Marie (1936) received a gold record from RCA Red Seal. Her other popular (and/or well-remembered) singles were "Beyond the Blue Horizon", "San Francisco", and "Ave Maria". "Beyond the Blue Horizon" peaked at #9 in the charts and became MacDonald's signature song; she performed it professionally three times in her career.

MacDonald's first studio album was MacDonald in Song (1939), followed by Religious Songs (1945) and Operetta Favorites (1946). Her first LP was Romantic Moments (1950), followed by Favorites, Favorites in Hi-Fi (1959), Smilin' Through (1960) and Jeanette MacDonald Sings Songs of Faith and Inspiration (1963). Seven official compilation albums were released, such as Jeanette MacDonald 1929–1939 and A Tribute to Jeanette MacDonald volumes 1 and 2, but due to the varying copyrights on audio worldwide, unofficial albums in MacDonald's name have been released on CDs in European countries under public domain.

Albums

Studio albums

Compilation albums

Songs

Singles

Selected list of other songs

Unreleased

References

Footnotes

Citations

Further reading

External links

Studio albums 

Discographies of American artists
Discography